Rajshree Thakur (born 22 September 1981) is an Indian actress best known for her role as Saloni in the Hindi television drama Saat Phere: Saloni Ka Safar and Preeti Jindal in Shaadi Mubarak.

Early Life 
She was born in Mumbai. Before Saat Phere: Saloni Ka Safar, she worked at All India Radio as a Marathi news reader and did ads for companies. Rajshree acted in the Indo-French film Hava Aney Dey directed by Partho Sen-Gupta. As a result, she was selected for the character of "Saloni" on Saat Phere: Saloni Ka Safar.

Career
Thakur made her film debut in the 2004 movie Hava Aney Dey.

She was awarded the Best Fresh Face of the Year - Female 2006 at the Sixth Indian Telly Awards along with Prachi Desai who stars in Kasamh Se.

She married her childhood friend Sanjot Vaidya in 2007.

Thakur debut in Zee TV's Popular show Saat Phere: Saloni Ka Safar (2005 - 2009). She also acted in the role of Maharani Jaiwanta Bai Songara (Maharana Pratap's Mother) in Bharat Ka Veer Putra – Maharana Pratap that aired on Sony TV in 2013 - 2014 ; 2015.

In August 2020, Thakur portrayed the female lead role of Preeti Jindal in Star Plus‘s Shaadi Mubarak opposite Manav Gohil. She quit the show in October due to hectic schedule. In replacement, Rati Pandey took the role. She is currently seen in show Appnapan - Badalte Rishton Ka Bandhan.

Filmography

Films

Television

Awards and nominations

References

External links

1981 births
Living people
Actresses from Mumbai
Indian television actresses
Indian film actresses
Actresses in Hindi television
Actresses in Hindi cinema
Actresses in Marathi cinema
All India Radio people
All India Radio women
Indian women radio presenters
Indian radio presenters
21st-century Indian actresses